Oracle Intelligent Advisor (OIA) formerly known as Oracle Policy Automation (OPA)  is a suite of decision automation software products for modeling and deploying business rules within the enterprise. Oracle Corporation acquired OPA in December 2008 when it purchased Australian software company RuleBurst Holdings, then trading as Haley. Oracle Intelligent Advisor transforms legislation and policy documents into executable business rules, for example for the calculation of benefit entitlements or discount amounts. Although OPA was originally developed for and sold to the public sector, it is now widely used in industry.

Oracle Intelligent Advisor continues to be available as an on-premise offering (known as private cloud) and as a public cloud solution. Web Service and generic connectors provide integration interfaces for applications or platforms using JSON and XML, enabling them to be the source of input data and the target of the results of the automated decision. Full auditing, traceability, transcripts and decision reporting helps organizations understand and justify the decision automation outcomes.

Features and components 
Oracle Policy Modeling is a Windows desktop application for transforming legislation and business policy into executable business rules. Rules are written in Microsoft Word and Excel documents using phrases in languages such as English, Chinese and French. These rule documents can be shared amongst business and information technology stakeholders, and commentary can be added into the documents without affecting the structure of the rules themselves. Other features of Oracle Policy Modeling include integrated test case execution and debugging capabilities, and the definition of interviews for interactive rule-based assessments. Interview screen order and branching logic can be defined using rules and attributes. The concept of relevancy is used to dynamically show only pertinent Screens.

The Oracle Intelligent Advisor decision automation comprises five main run-time elements:
 Web Determinations: An interview application that uses screens and stages defined in Oracle Policy Modeling to deliver Internet- and intranet-based interactive HTML assessments. Data entered is used in combination with backward chaining to determine which screens need to be shown to the user in order to reach a decision.
 Determinations Server: A WS-I Basic Profile compliant SOAP-based web service that exposes decision-making endpoints for deployed policy models. By passing data to the Determinations Server, and receiving responses in return, enterprises can integrate rule-based decision-making with other applications and BPM solutions. Examples include Oracle's Siebel, or BPEL- orchestrated business processes. If insufficient data is provided to reach a decision, Oracle Determinations Server is able to explain what additional data may be required.  The Determinations API also provides REST-based services for the same purpose.
Decision Services, introduced in 2020, allow for the rapid creation and deployment of REST-powered services without the need for a desktop deployment of Oracle Policy Modeling. The entire design, test and deployment cycle is performed in a Web browser.
The Intelligent Advisor Hub, a web-based application to manage the development repository, deployments, connections and other administrative features. 
REST APIs are provided to execute assessments both single and in batches, to provide management of Intelligent Advisor Hub users, permissions and administrative tasks and to provide programmatic access to deployments of Intelligent Advisor Policy Models. An OpenAPI 2.0 description is available.

Oracle Intelligent Advisor Cloud Service is available as a SaaS product. Oracle Intelligent Advisor is also available as an "on-premise" product, supported on Oracle WebLogic Server, Microsoft IIS, IBM WebSphere AS and Apache Tomcat in version 10, standardizing on Oracle WebLogic Server in version 12.

Connectors for enterprise applications such as Oracle's Siebel, Oracle CRM On Demand  and SAP are also available in version 10. The Oracle Intelligent Advisor platform in version 12 includes both XML and JSON-based connection APIs to allow standards-based integration with any application or data source using a standardized API. These are known as the Connector API (XML based) and the Generic Integration Protocol (REST based). Connectors for use in Oracle Intelligent Advisor HTML interviews are known as Interview Extension Connectors and use the Mozilla fetch() API to enable real-time integration of external sources into the Interview experience.

Versions 
The product now known as Oracle Intelligent Advisor has been sold under several different names, including Oracle Policy Automation (OPA), Haley Office Rules, and RuleBurst.

RuleBurst 7.0 was the successor to STATUTE Expert. Although customers of STATUTE Expert were able to upgrade to the later versions, RuleBurst 7.0 was the first version of the product that has become known as Oracle Intelligent Advisor today.

Oracle has released several versions of Oracle Intelligent Advisor since it was acquired. The product is now updated on a quarterly cycle with monthly updates between releases.

Applications and academic interest 
The Oracle Policy Automation software has been publicly deployed within many government web-sites. Australia's Department of Immigration and Citizenship uses it for visitors to check their eligibility for visas. The UK Revenue and Customs agency uses it for their Employment Status Indicator assessment tool; the UK government's old online portal for businesses also used OPA for over 60 interactive tools, while the United States IRS uses the software for guidance on tax law. In France, the CNAF uses Oracle Intelligent Advisor for benefit calculations. In the private sector, Oracle Intelligent Advisor is widely represented amongst different industries and brands.

Oracle Policy Modeling's controlled natural language approach to rule authoring has been the subject of some research.  The product was also used to help establish the viability of the Legal Knowledge Interchange Format standard developed by the Estrella Project

Dr Jason Sender of Rule Analytics Ltd produced a paper entitled "The Application of Design Patterns to Oracle Policy Automation" extracts of which are presented on this Intelligent Advisor Community website.

Acquisition and product name changes 
RuleBurst acquired the assets of Haley Systems in November 2007.
At the time, RuleBurst and Haley were both marketing "natural language business rules" software and were considered competitors. Prior to being acquired, Haley Systems had licensed its HaleyAuthority rules product to Siebel Systems. HaleyAuthority was made available in Siebel 8.0 with the integration going under the name "Siebel Business Rules". When Oracle acquired RuleBurst, Oracle standardized naming across the entire platform, first as Oracle Policy Automation, then with Oracle Intelligent Advisor representing the overall family comprising desktop tools, server components and integration capabilities starting in December 2019.

References

External links 
 Product Overview https://www.oracle.com/cx/service/intelligent-advisor/
 Public Forum https://community.oracle.com/tech/apps-infra/categories/intelligent_advisor_-_general_discussion

Business software
Collaborative software
Oracle software
Logic programming languages
Government by algorithm